The women's tournament of basketball at the 1996 Olympics at Atlanta, United States began on July 21 and ended on August 4, when the United States defeated Brazil 111–87 for the gold medal.

Participants

 (Host)

Format
 Twelve teams are split into 2 preliminary round groups of 6 teams each. The top 4 teams from each group qualify for the knockout stage.
 Fifth and sixth-placed teams from each group are ranked 9th–12th in two additional matches.
 In the quarterfinals, the matchups are as follows: A1 vs. B4, A2 vs. B3, A3 vs. B2 and A4 vs. B1.
The eliminated teams at the quarterfinals are ranked 5th–8th in two additional matches.
 The winning teams from the quarterfinals meet in the semifinals as follows: A3/B2 vs. A1/B4 and A2/B3 vs. A4/B1.
 The winning teams from the semifinals dispute the gold medal. The losing teams dispute the bronze.

Ties are broken via the following the criteria, with the first option used first, all the way down to the last option:
 Head to head results
 Goal average (not the goal difference) between the tied teams
 Goal average of the tied teams for all teams in its group

Squads

Preliminary round
The four best teams from each group advanced to the quarterfinal round.

Group A

Group B

Knockout stage

Championship bracket

Classification brackets

9th–12th Place

5th–8th Place

Classification round 9th−12th place

11th-place game

9th-place game

Quarterfinals

Classification round 5th−8th place

7th-place game

5th-place game

Semifinals

Bronze-medal game

Gold-medal game

Awards

Final standings

References

1996 Olympic Games: Tournament for Women, FIBA Archive. Accessed June 25, 2011.

External links
Basketball at the 1996 Summer Olympics – Women's basketball at Sports Reference

Basketball at the 1996 Summer Olympics
Basketball at the Summer Olympics – Women's tournament
Women's events at the 1996 Summer Olympics